Mark Andrew Skousen (born October 19, 1947) is an American economist and writer. He currently teaches at Chapman University, where he is a Presidential Fellow at The George L. Argyros School of Business and Economics. He has previously taught at Columbia Business School, Mercy College, Barnard College, and Rollins College.

Early life, education and family
Skousen was born on October 19, 1947, in San Diego, California, and grew up in Portland, Oregon. Conservative political commentator and survival strategist Joel Skousen and linguist Royal Skousen are his older brothers. He is the nephew of W. Cleon Skousen, the conservative author and faith-based political theorist. Mark Skousen earned his B.A. and Master's degree in economics from Brigham Young University and his Ph.D. in economics from George Washington University in 1977.

Skousen is a member of the Church of Jesus Christ of Latter-day Saints.  He, his wife Jo Ann, and their five children have lived in Washington, D.C.; Nassau, Bahamas; London, England; Orlando, Florida,  New York City and Orange, California.

Career
Skousen was an economic analyst for the CIA from 1972 to 1975. He later worked as a consultant for IBM and Hutchinson Technology, and other companies. He was a columnist for Forbes magazine from 1997 to 2001, and has contributed articles to The Wall Street Journal as well as to various libertarian periodicals. He has been a speaker at investment conferences and  has lectured for think tanks, From 2008 to 2010 he was a weekly contributor on CNBC's Kudlow & Company and has also appeared on C-SPAN Book TV and Fox News.

Skousen has been the editor of the Forecasts & Strategies financial newsletter since 1980. He also is the editor of four trading services (Five Star Trader, High-Income Alert, Fast Money Alert, and The 1600 Alert.) and publishes the Investor CAFÉ weekly electronic newsletter.

Economics 
Skousen is a proponent of Gross Output (GO), an economic concept used to measure total economic activity in the production of new goods and services in an accounting period. Skousen highlighted the concept in his work, The Structure of Production in 1990.

Lecturing
Skousen has lectured on economics and finance at Columbia Business School, Barnard College at Columbia University, Mercy College in New York, Rollins College in Winter Park, Florida and Chapman University in  Orange, California. In April 2005, distance education provider Grantham University renamed its online School of Business "The Mark Skousen School of Business."  He currently teaches at Chapman University and has been named a "Presidential Fellow" at Chapman University from 2014 to 2017.

Awards and recognition
In 2018, Skousen was awarded a Triple Crown in Economics by Steve Forbes for his work in economic theory, history and education.

Economic and political activities

Presidency at FEE
Skousen served as president of the free market nonprofit Foundation for Economic Education (FEE) from 2001 to 2002.

Skousen's brief tenure as president of FEE ended on a controversial note when he resigned in late 2002 at the request of the organization's board of trustees. This move followed Skousen's decision to invite, as keynote speaker for FEE's annual Liberty Banquet, New York City Mayor Rudy Giuliani. Giuliani proved to be an extremely unpopular choice among many of the organization's board members as well as several prominent libertarians.

FreedomFest
During his tenure at FEE, Skousen launched a non-partisan, libertarian conference, then titled "FEEFest," which premiered in Las Vegas in 2002. After Skousen left the presidency at FEE, the conference continued as "FreedomFest," first under the purview of Young America's Foundation, and later, under Skousen's own direction and ownership.

Written works 
Academic books
 The Structure of Production (New York University Press, 1990) 
 Economics on Trial (Irwin McGraw Hill, 1991; 2nd edition, 1993)  Translated into Japanese.
 Dissent on Keynes, editor (Praeger Publishing, 1992) 
 Puzzles and Paradoxes in Economics, co-authored with Kenna C. Taylor (Edward Elgar, 1997)  Translated into Korean and Chinese
 Economic Logic (Capital Press, 2000, 2008, 2011, 2014).  Fourth Edition includes chapters on macroeconomics and government policy, as well as microeconomics with Carl Menger's "theory of the good" and the profit-and-loss income statement to explain the dynamics of the market process, entrepreneurship, and the advantages of saving. Translated into Chinese by Shanghai University of Finance and Economics Press
 The Making of Modern Economics (M. E. Sharpe Publishers, 2001, 2009)  Winner 2009 Choice Outstanding Academic Title. Now in its second printing; translated into Chinese, Turkish, Mongolian, Spanish and Polish
 The Power of Economic Thinking (Foundation for Economic Education, 2002)  Translated into Chinese by Shanghai University of Finance and Economics Press
 Vienna and Chicago: Friends or Foes? A Tale of Two Schools of Free-Market Economics (Capital Press, 2005)  Translated into Chinese 
 The Completed Autobiography by Benjamin Franklin, compiled and edited by Mark Skousen (Regnery Books, 2006)  Regnery Publishing has also published in paperback the original Autobiography by Benjamin Franklin, edited with a new introduction by Mark Skousen, as Vol. I (1706–1757) and The Completed Autobiography by Benjamin Franklin as Vol. II (1757–1790)
 The Big Three in Economics: Adam Smith, Karl Marx and John Maynard Keynes (M. E. Sharpe, 2007) 
 EconoPower: How a New Generation of Economists Is Transforming the World (Wiley & Sons, 2008)  Translated into Korean & Portuguese
 High Finance on a Low Budget (Bantam Books, 1981, Dearborn, 1993), co-authored with Jo Ann Skousen 
 The Complete Guide to Financial Privacy (Simon & Schuster, 1983) 
 The Investor's Bible: Mark Skousen's Principles of Investment (Phillips Publishing, 1992)
 Secrets of the Great Investors, editor, audio tape series, narrated by Louis Rukeyser (Knowledge Products, 1997, 2006) 
 The New Scrooge Investing (McGraw Hill, 2000) 
 Investing in One Lesson (Regnery Publishing, Inc, 2007) 
 Maxims of Wall Street (Skousen Publishing, Inc 2011) 
 A Viennese Waltz Down Wall Street (Laissez Faire Books, 2013) 

Academic journal articles
 "Saving the Depression: A New Look at World War II," Review of Austrian Economics, 1987, vol. 2, No. 1
 "A Review of the New Palgrave," Review of Austrian Economics, 1988, vol. 3, No. 1
 "The Perseverance of Paul Samuelson's Economics," Journal of Economic Perspectives vol. 11, No. 2 (Spring, 1997), 137–152 
 "GO Beyond GDP: Introducing a New National Income Statistic," (presented at the "Macro Lunch", Columbia Business School, paper to be submitted to American Economic Review)
 "What Drives the Economy: Consumer Spending or Saving/Investment?  Using GDP, Gross Output and Other National Income Statistics to Determine Economic Performance," Backgrounder, 2004, Initiative for Policy Dialogue,
 "Gross Domestic Expenditures (GDE):  The Case for New National Aggregate Statistic", 2012, a working paper at University College of London 

Articles in edited volumes
 "The Great Depression," The Elgar Companion to Austrian Economics, ed. Peter J. Boettke. Hants, England: Edward Elgar, 1994
 "Financial Economics," The Elgar Companion to Austrian Economics, ed. Peter J. Boettke. Hants, England: Edward Elgar, 1994
 "Say's Law, Growth Theory, and Supply Side Economics," Two Hundred Years of Say's Law, ed. Steven Kates. Hants, England: Edward Elgar, 2003

References

External links

 
 
 Mark Skousen at Ludwig von Mises Institute

1947 births
Living people
21st-century American economists
American economics writers
American finance and investment writers
American investors
American Latter Day Saints
American libertarians
American male non-fiction writers
American textbook writers
Austrian School economists
Brigham Young University alumni
Columbia University faculty
Economists from Oregon
Foundation for Economic Education
Columbian College of Arts and Sciences alumni
Libertarian economists
Mercy College (New York) faculty
Rollins College faculty
Voluntaryists
Writers from Portland, Oregon